The 1910 Tour de France was the 8th edition of Tour de France, one of cycling's Grand Tours. The Tour began in Paris on 3 July and Stage 9 occurred on 19 July with a flat stage from Perpignan. The race finished in Paris on 31 July.

Stage 9
19 July 1910 — Perpignan to Luchon,

Stage 10
21 July 1910 — Luchon to Bayonne,

Stage 11
23 July 1910 — Bayonne to Bordeaux,

Stage 12
25 July 1910 — Bordeaux to Nantes,

Stage 13
27 July 1910 — Nantes to Brest,

Stage 14
29 July 1910 — Brest to Caen,

Stage 15
31 July 1910 — Caen to Paris,

References

1910 Tour de France
Tour de France stages